Temnolopha matura is a moth of the family Tortricidae. It is found in Thailand, Taiwan and Borneo.

The wingspan is about 17 mm. The forewings are leaden grey, becoming pale grey towards the tornus. The hindwings are dark fuscous purple.

References

Moths described in 1973
Olethreutini